KRPX (95.3 FM) is a hot adult contemporary formatted radio station.  Licensed to Wellington, Utah, United States, the station is currently owned by College Creek Media, LLC and features programming from Fox News Radio and Premiere Networks.

References

External links

RPX